Nikola Žakula (born 18 August 1992) is a Serbian footballer who plays for Inđija.

Club career
Žakula started his career with football club Železničar Beograd, where he played between 2010 and 2011. Later he played for a period with Jedinstvo Stara Pazova in the Vojvodina League West and Serbian League Vojvodina. Next he also in the same league rank played as a member of RFK Novi Sad, Dunav Stari Banovci and ČSK Čelarevo. Scoring 5 goals on 15 league matches, Žakula helped ČSK to win the first place and make promotion to the 2015–16 Serbian First League. At the beginning of 2017, Žakula signed a three-year contract with the Serbian SuperLiga side Radnik Surdulica, along with teammate Mladen Vukasović. In the first friendly match for new club, Žakula score two goals against Radnički Pirot.

Career statistics

Honours
ČSK Čelarevo
Serbian League Vojvodina: 2014–15

References

External links
 
 

1992 births
Living people
Footballers from Belgrade
Association football midfielders
Serbian footballers
FK Železničar Beograd players
RFK Novi Sad 1921 players
FK ČSK Čelarevo players
FK Radnik Surdulica players
FK Mačva Šabac players
OFK Bačka players
FK Inđija players
Serbian First League players
Serbian SuperLiga players